The 1999 ATP Super 9 (also known as Mercedes-Benz Super 9 for sponsorship reasons) were part of the 1999 ATP Tour, the elite tour for professional men's tennis organised by the Association of Tennis Professionals.

Results

Titles Champions

Singles

See also 
 ATP Tour Masters 1000
 1999 ATP Tour
 1999 WTA Tier I Series
 1999 WTA Tour

External links 
 Official ATP Tour website.

Atp Super 9, 1999
ATP Tour Masters 1000